Hunger and Thirst is the second studio album by American indie rock band Typhoon. It was released in May 2010.

This was their only studio album released under Tender Loving Empire.

Background

Morton has said the album was influenced by the structure of David Lynch's films by having nice surface music but being much darker under the surface with his lyrics.

It took Morton about two years to write the album and it was recorded in three to four months.

Track listing

Release history

Credits

Musicians
 Kyle Morton – lead vocals, bass, piano, guitar
 Tyler Ferrin – french horn, trombone, trumpet, backing vocals
 Alex Fitch – drums, percussion, backing vocals
 Devin Gallagher – glockenspiel, percussion, backing vocals
 Dave Hall – guitar, backing vocals
 Grant Hall – mellophone, backing vocals
 Pieter Hilton – drums, percussion, vocals
 Paige Morton – violin
 Eric Stipe – trumpet, backing vocals
 Toby Tanabe – bass, backing vocals
 Nora Zimmerly – bells, backing vocals

Additional musicians
 Phil Gaudette – choir
 Olivia Miller – choir
 Anna Ottum – choir
 Danielle Sullivan – choir
 Erin O'Ferrell – violin

Production
 Mixed by Paul Laxer
 Mastering by Gus Elg
 Artwork by Rick Delucco

References

External links
Official website

2010 albums
Typhoon (American band) albums